The 1980 United States Senate election in Indiana took place on November 4, 1980, along with elections to the United States Senate in other states as well as the presidential election, elections to the United States House of Representatives and various state and local elections. Incumbent Democratic U.S. Senator Birch Bayh ran for a fourth term, but was defeated by Republican nominee, U.S. Representative Dan Quayle.

Republican primary

Candidates 
 Roger F. Marsh, author and activist
 Dan Quayle, U.S. Representative

Results

General election

Candidates 
 Birch Bayh (D), incumbent U.S. Senator
 Dan Quayle (R), U.S. Representative

Campaign 
Birch Bayh, the incumbent Senator, faced no opposition from Indiana and avoided a primary election. Bayh was originally elected in 1962 and re-elected in 1968 and 1974. He was Chairman of Senate Intelligence Committee and architect of 25th and 26th Amendments. This election was one of the key races in the country, and signaled a trend that would come to be known as Reagan's coattails, describing the influence Ronald Reagan had in congressional elections.  Incumbent three-term Senator Birch Bayh was defeated by over 160,000 votes to Representative Dan Quayle, who would later go on to be Vice President of the United States. Birch's son Evan would be elected to this senate seat 18 years later in 1998.

Results

See also 
 1980 United States Senate elections
 List of United States senators from Indiana

Notes 

1980
Indiana
1980 Indiana elections
Dan Quayle